Kekaha (literally, "the place" in Hawaiian) is a census-designated place (CDP) in Kauai County, Hawaii, United States. The population was 3,715 at the 2020 census, up from 3,175 at the 2000 census.

History

For most of the 20th century, the Kekaha Sugar Mill (owned by Amfac) was the centerpiece of agriculture on Kauai's west side. The sugar mill had a major influence in Kekaha's development, including banking, employment, transportation, housing and utilities such as water and electricity. The mill employed several generations of local families. It closed in 2000 when the entire sugar industry in Hawaii collapsed. The mill was purchased in 2005 by mainland investors who sold off its heavy machinery to other mills as far away as Africa.

Hawaii's first (and only) train robbery occurred here in February 1920, when a masked gunman stopped a slow-moving sugar train and escaped with the locomotive and $11,000 taken from the labor paymaster on board. Police recovered the money in a swamp near the home of a local fisherman, whose suspicious behavior soon resulted in his arrest and conviction. The fisherman was a big fan of Western movies, and was thought to have been inspired by some of the films he had seen.

Geography
Kekaha is located on the southwest side of the island of Kauai at  (21.971690, -159.716290). It is bordered to the east by Waimea and to the south by the Pacific Ocean. Hawaii Route 50 passes through the community, leading northwest  to its end at the Pacific Missile Range Facility and east  to Kalaheo.

Demographics

As of the census of 2000, there were 3,175 people, 1,073 households, and 799 families residing in the CDP. The racial makeup of the CDP was 15.9% White, 0.2% African American, 0.5% Native American, 43.6% Asian, 12.4% Pacific Islander, 1.0% from other races, and 26.4% from two or more races. Hispanic or Latino of any race were 8.7% of the population.

There were 1,073 households, out of which 30.4% had children under the age of 18 living with them, 55.9% were married couples living together, 13.1% had a female householder with no husband present, and 25.5% were non-families. 21.4% of all households were made up of individuals, and 9.4% had someone living alone who was 65 years of age or older.  The average household size was 2.96 and the average family size was 3.44.

In the CDP the population was spread out, with 25.1% under the age of 18, 7.5% from 18 to 24, 24.4% from 25 to 44, 27.4% from 45 to 64, and 15.6% who were 65 years of age or older.  The median age was 40 years. For every 100 females, there were 98.1 males.  For every 100 females age 18 and over, there were 96.2 males.

The median income for a household in the CDP was $41,103, and the median income for a family was $48,629. Males had a median income of $32,969 versus $26,739 for females. The per capita income for the CDP was $17,117.  About 10.9% of families and 11.2% of the population were below the poverty line, including 11.8% of those under age 18 and 11.1% of those age 65 or over.

Items of interest

Located near Kekaha is the U.S. Navy Pacific Missile Range Facility (PMRF). Within PMRF's property is located WWVH, the U.S.'s Pacific-region short-wave station operated by NIST broadcasting time signals from an atomic clock.  The station also broadcasts weather alerts for portions of the Pacific Ocean. Kekaha Beach Park offers splendid views of Niihau, Hawaii's Forbidden Island.

Education
Hawaii Department of Education operates public schools, including:
 Kekaha Elementary School<ref>

Niihau School of Kekaha is a charter K-12 school in Kekaha.

Communications
Circa 1962, the Army Radio Station a few miles west of Kekaha provided ionospheric and tropospheric scatter communications as part of a line of stations from California to Vietnam, sending TTY (Teleprinter) traffic back and forth during the Vietnam War.

References

Census-designated places in Kauai County, Hawaii
Populated places on Kauai
Sugar plantations in Hawaii
Populated coastal places in Hawaii